Wierzchosławice may refer to the following places in Poland:
Wierzchosławice, Lower Silesian Voivodeship (south-west Poland)
Wierzchosławice, Lesser Poland Voivodeship (south Poland)